Ballaghaderreen is a town in County Roscommon, Ireland. It was part of County Mayo prior to 1898. It is located just off the N5 National primary road. The population was 1,808 in the 2016 census.

History 

As of 1837, the town was recorded as having 1147 inhabitants in about 200 houses and as "rising in importance" as a post-town, being on the (then) new mail coach road from Ballina to Longford.

As of the mid-19th century, markets were held on Fridays, with seven fairs held throughout the year.  A court-house, market house and an infantry barracks to accommodate 94 persons had all been established by that time.

In 1860, Ballaghaderreen Cathedral was dedicated as the cathedral for the Roman Catholic Diocese of Achonry.

In March 2017, Ballaghaderreen became an Emergency Reception and Orientation Centre (EROC) for hundreds of refugees from the Syrian Civil War. In April 2018, the community was honoured with a People of the Year Award for welcoming the refugees into the community.

Governance

Ballaghadereen is part of the Barony of Costello and in the parish of Kilcoleman. 

Ballaghaderreen has been part of County Roscommon since 1898 when the town and parish of Ballaghaderreen and Edmondstown were transferred from County Mayo under the Local Government Act 1898. (This has led to some anomalies; for example, the local Gaelic Athletic Association team is affiliated with the Mayo GAA county board.)

Sports

The local Gaelic football club is Ballaghaderreen GAA. It is affiliated with the Mayo GAA county board.

Ballaghaderreen FC, the local association football (soccer) club, was founded in 1967.

Transport
Ballaghaderreen was previously located on the N5 national primary road linking Longford to Westport. However, the town was bypassed in September 2014 with the re-routing of the N5 to the north of the town.

The nearest railway stations are in Castlerea (21 km) and Boyle (26 km). Ballaghaderreen was previously served by the Ballaghaderreen branch line from Kilfree Junction, with Ballaghaderreen railway station having opened on 2 November 1874 and closed permanently on 4 February 1963. The station house remains standing, in a state of severe dereliction, just off Station Road.

Ballaghaderreen is on the main Dublin-Ballina bus route and there are several buses daily serving this route and is located 22 km from Ireland West Airport Knock.

People
 Anne Deane, nationalist, businesswoman and philanthropist
 John Blake Dillon, writer, politician, and founding member of the Young Ireland movement
 James Dillon, politician, leader of the opposition and leader of Fine Gael
 Dermot Flanagan, Gaelic footballer
 Thomas Flynn, Bishop of Achonry
 Pearce Hanley, Australian Rules footballer
 Garry Hynes, first female Tony Award winner for direction of a play
 Matt Molloy, Irish flute player
 Andy Moran, Gaelic footballer
 Patsy McGarry Irish Times journalist
 Máire McDonnell-Garvey, traditional Irish musician
 John O'Gorman, piper
 Brian O'Doherty, writer, artist, art critic and academic
 William Partridge, trade unionist and revolutionary socialist

See also
 List of towns and villages in Ireland

References

External links

 Ballaghaderreen.com

Towns and villages in County Roscommon